John Dean Kuku (born 1963) is a politician of Solomon Islands who served as Minister of Public Service (from 15 December 2014 to 4 August 2017) and has been Minister of Education and Human Resources Development since 4 August 2017.

References

Solomon Islands politicians
Government ministers of the Solomon Islands
1963 births
Living people